Utricularia mirabilis is a small, perennial, rheophytic carnivorous plant that belongs to the genus Utricularia. U. mirabilis is endemic to Venezuela, where it is known from the type location near Campo Grande. It has been collected in fruit and flower in December. It was originally described and published by Peter Taylor in 1986.

See also 
 List of Utricularia species

References 

Carnivorous plants of South America
Flora of Venezuela
mirabilis